Teinostomatidae is a family of very small and minute sea snails with an operculum, marine gastropod mollusks in the superfamily Truncatelloidea

Genera
 Teinostoma H. Adams & A. Adams, 1853
Synonyms
 Pseudorotella P. Fischer, 1857: synonym of Teinostoma H. Adams & A. Adams, 1853
 Tinostoma P. Fischer, 1885: synonym of Teinostoma H. Adams & A. Adams, 1853 (Unjustified emendation)

References

External links

  Cossmann M. & Peyrot A. (1917). Conchologie néogènique de l'Aquitaine. Actes de la Société Linnéenne de Bordeaux. 69(3): 157-284; 69(4): 285-365
 Goto, R.; Takano, T.; Eernisse, D. J.; Kato, M.; Kano, Y. (2021). Snails riding mantis shrimps: Ectoparasites evolved from ancestors living as commensals on the host's burrow wall. Molecular Phylogenetics and Evolution. 163: 107122

Truncatelloidea